Huntington is an unincorporated community in Marion County, Florida, United States, west of Baseline Road, between Ocala and Belleview. The community is part of the Ocala Metropolitan Statistical Area.

External links

Unincorporated communities in Marion County, Florida
Unincorporated communities in Florida